Carlo Galli (Florence, 25 November 1878 – Venice, 12 January 1966) was an Italian diplomat, who served as Italian ambassador to Persia, Portugal, Yugoslavia and Turkey and as Minister of Popular Culture of the Kingdom of Italy in the Badoglio I Cabinet.

Biography

After graduating in law from the University of Florence, in 1904 Galli started his diplomatic career at the Italian consulate in Trieste, where he remained for some years, helping fuel Italian irredentism (he himself was a convinced nationalist). In June 1911 he was appointed consul in Tripoli, where he helped prepare the Italian invasion of Libya, after which he returned to Trieste. He later held other consular posts abroad (and was a member of the International Control Commission in Albania in 1913) until the outbreak of the First World War, when he was transferred to the General Secretariat for Civil Affairs at the Supreme Command. 

After the end of the war, from January 1919 to December 1922, he was sent to Paris and was part of the Italian delegation to the Versailles Peace Conference. In January 1923 he was appointed Consul General in Damascus, where he remained until April 1924, when he was appointed Ambassador to Teheran (Persia) for two years, having meanwhile joined the National Fascist Party. From November 1926 to May 1928 he served as Ambassador to Lisbon (Portugal), from June 1928 to December 1934 as Ambassador to Belgrade (Yugoslavia), and from January 1935 to June 1938 as Ambassador to Ankara (Turkey). During the 1930s he became increasingly detached from the Fascist regime, until he was retired in June 1938. In 1939 he joined the board of directors of Assicurazioni Generali, where he remained for some years. 

After the fall of the regime on 25 July 1943 he returned to politics and in August he was appointed Minister of Popular Culture of the first Badoglio Government, formally holding the post from 15 August 1943 to 24 February 1944, although in reality he ceased from his functions following the armistice of Cassibile, as he did not follow the king and government in their flight from Rome to Brindisi and retired to private life in Venice. He was however wanted by the Italian Social Republic and was forced to go into hiding in Nerviano, hosted by his friend Paolo Caccia Dominioni, until in December 1944 he was arrested along with Caccia Dominoni himself and General Luigi Trionfi and imprisoned initially in San Vittore and later in Lumezzane, where he remained until April 1945. At the end of the war he was freed and was able to return to Venice, where he retired to private life.

References

1878 births
1966 deaths
Government ministers of Italy
Italian diplomats
Ambassadors of Italy to Turkey
Ambassadors of Italy to Yugoslavia
Ambassadors of Italy to Iran
Ambassadors of Italy to Portugal